Bishop Isidoro Pentorio, B. (1568–1622) was a Roman Catholic prelate who served as Bishop of Asti (1619–1622).

Biography
Isidoro Pentorio was born in Milan, Italy in 1568 and ordained a priest in the Clerics Regular of Saint Paul.
On 18 February 1619, he was appointed during the papacy of Pope Paul V as Bishop of Asti.
On 12 March 1619, he was consecrated bishop by Pietro Aldobrandini, Archbishop of Ravenna, with Philibert François Milliet de Faverges, Archbishop of Turin, and Tommaso Piolatto, Bishop of Fossano, serving as co-consecrators. 
He served as Bishop of Asti until his death in 1622.

References

External links and additional sources
 (for Chronology of Bishops) 
 (for Chronology of Bishops) 

17th-century Italian Roman Catholic bishops
Bishops appointed by Pope Paul V
Clergy from Milan
1568 births
1622 deaths
Barnabite bishops